The 2011–12 Winnipeg Jets season was the 13th season for the National Hockey League (NHL) franchise and the first in Winnipeg, after 12 seasons as the Atlanta Thrashers. The franchise played in Atlanta since the 1999–2000 NHL season, and relocated to Winnipeg following the conclusion of the 2010–11 NHL season. The relocation of the Thrashers to Winnipeg was confirmed by NHL Commissioner Gary Bettman on May 31, 2011, and approved by the NHL Board of Governors on June 21, 2011.  The 2011–12 season also marks the first appearance of the Winnipeg Jets name in the NHL since the previous franchise moved from Winnipeg to Phoenix in 1996. At the end of the regular season, the team failed to qualify for the 2012 Stanley Cup playoffs.

Off-season 
On May 31, 2011, at a press conference at the MTS Centre, NHL Commissioner Gary Bettman confirmed that the Atlanta Thrashers had been sold to True North Sports and Entertainment and would relocate to Winnipeg for the 2011–12 NHL season after a unanimous vote favoring the sale and relocation at the Board of Governors meeting on June 21, 2011. On June 4, 2011, the new owners informed general manager Rick Dudley that he would no longer be general manager of the franchise, and that the last four years of his contract were to be bought-out.

On June 8, 2011, Winnipeg named Kevin Cheveldayoff as their new general manager, having previously been serving as the assistant general manager for the Chicago Blackhawks. Additionally, on June 20, 2011, new ownership informed Craig Ramsay that he was no longer the coach of the team. Former Edmonton Oilers head coach Craig MacTavish was also informed he was out of the running for the head coaching position. On June 24, True North announced that Claude Noel would be the first head coach of the new team in Winnipeg. Noel had spent the previous season as the head coach of the American Hockey League's Manitoba Moose.

The team's name was revealed to be the "Jets" at the 2011 NHL Entry Draft before the team made their selection. On August 15, Rick Rypien was found deceased at his home in Alberta. Rypien had signed a contract with the Jets in the off-season. He was 27 years old. The Jets unveiled their new jerseys at an event held on September 6 at 17 Wing in Winnipeg.

Regular season 
The Winnipeg team retained the Thrashers' place in the Southeast Division. The team played six games against its division opponents; four against other Eastern conference teams; and one or two games against Western conference teams.

Playoffs 
The Jets failed to qualify for the 2012 NHL Playoffs, finishing eleventh in the Eastern Conference.

Standings

Schedule and results

Pre-season 

|- align="center" bgcolor=#FFBBBB
| 1 ||rowspan=2 bgcolor=#EEEECC| September 20 || @ Columbus Blue Jackets (split-squad) || 1–5 || || Chris Mason || Nationwide Arena || 8,855 ||rowspan=2 bgcolor=#EEEECC| 1–1–0
|- align="center" bgcolor=#CCFFCC
| 2 || Columbus Blue Jackets (split-squad) || 6–1 || || Ondrej Pavelec || MTS Centre || 15,004
|- align="center" bgcolor=#FFBBBB
| 3 || September 24 || @ Nashville Predators || 3–4 || || Chris Mason || Bridgestone Arena || 14,701 || 1–2–0
|- align="center" bgcolor=#FFBBBB
| 4 || September 25 || @ Carolina Hurricanes || 0–4 || || David Aebischer || Time Warner Cable Arena || N/A || 1–3–0
|- align="center" bgcolor=CCFFCC
| 5 || September 26 || @ Ottawa Senators || 3–1 || || Ondrej Pavelec || Mile One Centre ||  || 2–3–0
|- align="center" bgcolor=#CCFFCC
| 6 || September 28 || Carolina Hurricanes || 1–3 || ||  || MTS Centre || 15,004 || 3–3–0
|- align="center" bgcolor=#EEEECC
| 7 || September 30 || Nashville Predators || 3–2 || SO ||  || MTS Centre || 15,004 || 3–3–1
|-

Regular season 

|- align="center" bgcolor=#FFBBBB
| 1 || October 9 || Montreal Canadiens || 1–5 ||  || T. Plekanec || O. Pavelec || MTS Centre || 15,004 || 0–1–0 || 0
|- align="center" bgcolor=#FFBBBB
| 2 || October 13 || @ Chicago Blackhawks || 3–4 ||  || P. Kane || O. Pavelec || United Center ||  21,175|| 0–2–0 || 0
|- align="center" bgcolor=#FFBBBB
| 3 || October 15 || @ Phoenix Coyotes || 1–4 ||  || O. Ekman-Larsson || C. Mason || Jobing.com Arena || 17,132 || 0–3–0 || 0
|- align="center" bgcolor=#CCFFCC
| 4 || October 17 || Pittsburgh Penguins || 2–1 || || O. Pavelec || O. Pavelec || MTS Centre || 15,004 || 1–3–0 || 2
|- align="center" bgcolor="white"
| 5 || October 19 || @ Toronto Maple Leafs || 3–4 || OT(SO) || J. Lupul || O. Pavelec || Air Canada Centre || 19,514 || 1–3–1 || 3
|- align="center" bgcolor=#FFBBBB
| 6 || October 20 || @ Ottawa Senators || 1–4 ||  || C. Anderson ||  O. Pavelec || Scotiabank Place || 17,919 || 1–4–1 || 3
|- align="center" bgcolor=#CCFFCC
| 7 || October 22 || Carolina Hurricanes || 5–3 ||  || C. Mason || C. Mason || MTS Centre || 15,004 || 2–4–1 || 5
|- align="center" bgcolor=#FFBBBB
| 8 || October 24 || New York Rangers || 1–2 ||  || M. Biron || C. Mason || MTS Centre || 15,004 || 2–5–1 || 5
|- align="center" bgcolor=#CCFFCC
| 9 || October 27 || @ Philadelphia Flyers || 9–8 ||  || N. Antropov || O. Pavelec || Wells Fargo Center || 19,588 || 3–5–1 || 7
|- align="center" bgcolor=#FFBBBB
| 10 || October 29 || @ Tampa Bay Lightning || 0–1 ||  || D. Roloson || O. Pavelec || St. Pete Times Forum || 19,204 || 3–6–1 || 7
|- align="center" bgcolor=#CCFFCC
| 11 || October 31 || @ Florida Panthers || 4–3 || OT(SO) || A. Ladd || O. Pavelec || BankAtlantic Center || 11,855 || 4–6–1 || 9
|-

|- align="center" bgcolor=#CCFFCC
| 12 || November 3 || @ New York Islanders || 3–0 || || O. Pavelec || O. Pavelec || Nassau Veterans Memorial Coliseum || 10,157 || 5–6–1 || 11
|- align="center" bgcolor="white"
| 13 || November 5 || @ New Jersey Devils || 2–3 || OT || A. Henrique || O. Pavelec || Prudential Center || 14,952 || 5–6–2 || 12
|- align="center" bgcolor=#FFBBBB
| 14 || November 6 || @ New York Rangers || 0–3 ||  || D. Stepan || O. Pavelec || Madison Square Garden || 18,200 || 5–7–2 || 12
|- align="center" bgcolor="white"
| 15 || November 8 || @ Buffalo Sabres || 5–6 || OT || J. Pominville || O. Pavelec || First Niagara Center || 18,690 || 5–7–3 || 13
|- align="center" bgcolor=#FFBBBB
| 16 || November 10 || Florida Panthers || 2–5 ||  || K. Versteeg || O. Pavelec || MTS Centre || 15,004 || 5–8–3 || 13
|- align="center" bgcolor=#FFBBBB
| 17 || November 12 || @ Columbus Blue Jackets || 1–2 ||  || R. Johansen || O. Pavelec || Nationwide Arena || 15,581 || 5–9–3 || 13
|- align="center" bgcolor=#CCFFCC
| 18 || November 14 || Tampa Bay Lightning || 5–2 ||  || D. Byfuglien || O. Pavelec || MTS Centre || 15,004 || 6–9–3 || 15
|- align="center" bgcolor=#CCFFCC
| 19 || November 17 || Washington Capitals || 4–1 || || E. Kane || O. Pavelec || MTS Centre || 15,004 || 7–9–3 || 17
|- align="center" bgcolor=#CCFFCC
| 20 || November 19 || Philadelphia Flyers || 6–4 ||  || D. Byfuglien || O. Pavelec || MTS Centre || 15,004 || 8–9–3 || 19
|- align="center" bgcolor="white"
| 21 || November 23 || @ Washington Capitals || 3–4 || OT || J. Chimera || O. Pavelec || Verizon Center || 18,506 || 8–9–4 || 20
|- align="center" bgcolor=#CCFFCC
| 22 || November 25 || @ Carolina Hurricanes || 3–1 ||  || A. Ladd || C. Mason || RBC Center || 15,718 || 9–9–4 || 22
|- align="center" bgcolor=#FFBBBB
| 23 || November 26 || @ Boston Bruins || 2–4 ||  || C. Kelly || O. Pavelec || TD Garden || 17,565 || 9–10–4 || 22
|- align="center" bgcolor=#FFBBBB
| 24 || November 29 || Ottawa Senators || 4–6 ||  || E. Kane || O. Pavelec || MTS Centre || 15,004 || 9–11–4 || 22
|-

|- align="center" bgcolor=#CCFFCC
| 25 || December 1 || Phoenix Coyotes || 1–0 ||  || O. Pavelec || O. Pavelec || MTS Centre || 15,004 || 10–11–4 || 24
|- align="center" bgcolor=#CCFFCC
| 26 || December 3 || New Jersey Devils || 4–2 ||  || E. Kane || O. Pavelec || MTS Centre || 15,004 || 11–11–4 || 26
|- align="center" bgcolor=#CCFFCC
| 27 || December 6 || Boston Bruins || 2–1 ||  || O. Pavelec || O. Pavelec || MTS Centre || 15,004 || 12–11–4 || 28
|- align="center" bgcolor=#CCFFCC
| 28 || December 9 || Carolina Hurricanes || 4–2 ||  || B. Wheeler || C. Mason || MTS Centre || 15,004 || 13–11–4 || 30
|- align="center" bgcolor=#FFBBBB
| 29 || December 10 || @ Detroit Red Wings || 1–7 ||  || V. Filppula || O. Pavelec || Joe Louis Arena || 20,066 || 13–12–4 || 30
|- align="center" bgcolor=#CCFFCC
| 30 || December 13 || Minnesota Wild || 2–1 ||  || O. Pavelec || O. Pavelec || MTS Centre || 15,004 || 14–12–4 || 32
|- align="center" bgcolor=#FFBBBB
| 31 || December 15 || Washington Capitals || 0–1 ||  || M. Neuvirth || O. Pavelec || MTS Centre || 15,004 || 14–13–4 || 32
|- align="center" bgcolor=#CCFFCC
| 32 || December 17 || Anaheim Ducks || 5–3 ||  || Z. Bogosian || C. Mason || MTS Centre || 15,004 || 15–13–4 || 34
|- align="center" bgcolor="white"
| 33 || December 20 || New York Islanders || 2–3 || OT(SO) || N. Antropov || O. Pavelec || MTS Centre || 15,004 || 15–13–5 || 35
|- align="center" bgcolor=#CCFFCC
| 34 || December 22 || Montreal Canadiens || 4–0 ||  || B. Wheeler || O. Pavelec || MTS Centre || 15,004 || 16–13–5 || 37
|- align="center" bgcolor=#FFBBBB
| 35 || December 23 || Pittsburgh Penguins || 1–4 ||  || C. Kunitz || O. Pavelec || MTS Centre || 15,004 || 16–14–5 || 37
|- align="center" bgcolor=#CCFFCC
| 36 || December 27 || @ Colorado Avalanche || 4–1 ||  || E. Kane || O. Pavelec || Pepsi Center || 18,007 || 17–14–5 || 39
|- align="center" bgcolor=#CCFFCC
| 37 || December 29 || Los Angeles Kings || 1–0 || OT || C. Mason || C. Mason || MTS Centre || 15,004 || 18–14–5 || 41
|- align="center" bgcolor=#CCFFCC
| 38 || December 31 || Toronto Maple Leafs || 3–2 ||  || B. Wheeler || O. Pavelec || MTS Centre || 15,004 || 19–14–5 || 43
|-

|- align="center" bgcolor=#FFBBBB
| 39 || January 4 || @ Montreal Canadiens || 3–7 ||  || L. Eller || O. Pavelec || Bell Centre || 21,273 || 19–15–5 || 43
|- align="center" bgcolor=#FFBBBB
| 40 || January 5 || @ Toronto Maple Leafs || 0–4 ||  || J. Gustavsson || C. Mason || Air Canada Centre || 19,514 || 19–16–5 || 43
|- align="center" bgcolor=#CCFFCC
| 41 || January 7 || @ Buffalo Sabres || 2–1 || OT || J. Oduya || O. Pavelec || First Niagara Center || 18,690 || 20–16–5 || 45
|- align="center" bgcolor=#FFBBBB
| 42 || January 10 || @ Boston Bruins || 3–5 ||  || N. Horton || O. Pavelec || TD Garden || 17,565 || 20–17–5 || 45
|- align="center" bgcolor=#FFBBBB
| 43 || January 12 || San Jose Sharks || 0–2 ||  || Couture || O. Pavelec || MTS Centre || 15,004 || 20–18–5 || 45
|- align="center" bgcolor=#FFBBBB
| 44 || January 14 || New Jersey Devils || 1–2 ||  || P. Elias || O. Pavelec || MTS Centre || 15,004 || 20–19–5 || 45
|- align="center" bgcolor=#CCFFCC
| 45 || January 16 || @ Ottawa Senators || 2–0 ||  || T. Enstrom || C. Mason || Scotiabank Place || 19,927 || 21–19–5 || 47
|- align="center" bgcolor=#FFBBBB
| 46 || January 17 || @ New Jersey Devils || 1–5 ||  || I. Kovalchuk || C. Mason || Prudential Center || 14,129 || 21–20–5 || 47
|- align="center" bgcolor=#CCFFCC
| 47 || January 19 || Buffalo Sabres || 4–1 ||  || T. Enstrom || O. Pavelec || MTS Centre || 15,004 || 22–20–5 || 49
|- align="center" bgcolor="white"
| 48 || January 21 || Florida Panthers || 3–4 || SO || K. Versteeg || O. Pavelec || MTS Centre || 15,004 || 22–20–6 || 50
|- align="center" bgcolor=#FFBBBB
| 49 || January 23 || @ Carolina Hurricanes || 1–2 ||  || C. Ward || C. Mason || RBC Center || 16,045 || 22–21–6 || 50
|- align="center" bgcolor=#FFBBBB
| 50 || January 24 || @ New York Rangers || 0–3 ||  || H. Lundqvist || O. Pavelec || Madison Square Garden || 18,200 || 22–22–6 || 50
|- align="center" bgcolor=#CCFFCC
| 51 || January 31 || @ Philadelphia Flyers || 2–1 || SO || B. Little || O. Pavelec || Wells Fargo Center || 19,874 || 23–22–6 || 52
|-

|- align="center" bgcolor=#ccffcc
| 52 || February 2 || @ Tampa Bay Lightning || 2–1 || OT || K. Wellwood || O. Pavelec || St. Pete Times Forum || 16,923 || 24–22–6 || 54
|- align="center" bgcolor=#ffbbbb
| 53 || February 3 || @ Florida Panthers || 1–2 ||  || K. Versteeg || C. Mason || BankAtlantic Center || 16,773 || 24–23–6 || 54
|- align="center" bgcolor=#ffbbbb
| 54 || February 5 || @ Montreal Canadiens || 0–3 ||  || C. Price || O. Pavelec || Bell Centre || 21,273 || 24–24–6 || 54
|- align="center" bgcolor=#ccffcc
| 55 || February 7 || Toronto Maple Leafs || 2–1 ||  || B. Wheeler || O. Pavelec || MTS Centre || 15,004 || 25–24–6 || 56
|- align="center" bgcolor=#CCFFCC
| 56 || February 9 || @ Washington Capitals || 3–2 || SO || A. Ovechkin || O. Pavelec || Verizon Center || 18,506 || 26–24–6 || 58
|- align="center" bgcolor=#ffbbbb
| 57 || February 10 || @ Pittsburgh Penguins || 5–8 ||  || E. Malkin || O. Pavelec || Consol Energy Center || 18,602 || 26–25–7 || 58
|- align="center" bgcolor=#ffbbbb
| 58 || February 14 || New York Islanders || 1–3 ||  || P. Parenteau || O. Pavelec || MTS Centre || 15,004 || 26–26–6 || 58
|- align="center" bgcolor=#CCFFCC
| 59 || February 16 || @ Minnesota Wild || 4–3 || SO || E. Kane || C. Mason || Xcel Energy Center || 19,060 || 27–26–6 || 60
|- align="center" bgcolor=#ccffcc
| 60 || February 17 || Boston Bruins || 4–2 ||  || B. Wheeler || O. Pavelec || MTS Centre || 15,004 || 28–26–6 || 62
|- align="center" bgcolor=#ccffcc
| 61 || February 19 || Colorado Avalanche || 5–1 ||  || B. Wheeler || O. Pavelec || MTS Centre || 15,004 || 29–26–6 || 64
|- align="center" bgcolor="white"
| 62 || February 21 || Philadelphia Flyers || 5–4 || OT || O. Pavelec || O. Pavelec || MTS Centre || 15,004 || 29–26–7 || 65
|- align="center" bgcolor=#ccffcc
| 63 || February 23 || Tampa Bay Lightning || 4–3 ||  || A. Ladd || O. Pavelec || MTS Centre || 15,004 || 30–26–7 || 67
|- align="center" bgcolor="white"
| 64 || February 25 || St. Louis Blues || 2–3 || SO || B. Wheeler || C. Mason || MTS Centre || 15,004 || 30–26–8 || 68
|- align="center" bgcolor=#ffbbbb
| 65 || February 27 || Edmonton Oilers || 3–5 ||  || T. Hall || O. Pavelec || MTS Centre || 15,004 || 30–27–8 || 68
|-

|- align="center" bgcolor=#ccffcc
| 66 || March 1 || Florida Panthers || 7–0 ||  || E. Kane || O. Pavelec || MTS Centre || 15,004 || 31–27–8 || 70
|- align="center" bgcolor=#ccffcc
| 67 || March 5 || Buffalo Sabres || 3–1 ||  || B. Little || O. Pavelec || MTS Centre || 15,004 || 32–27–8 || 72
|- align="center" bgcolor=#ffbbbb
| 68 || March 8 || @ Vancouver Canucks || 2–3 ||  || R. Kesler || O. Pavelec || Rogers Arena || 18,890 || 32–28–8 || 72
|- align="center" bgcolor=#ffbbbb
| 69 || March 9 || @ Calgary Flames || 3–5 ||  || A. Tanguay || O. Pavelec || Scotiabank Saddledome || 19,289 || 32–29–8 || 72
|- align="center" bgcolor=#ccffcc
| 70 || March 14 || Dallas Stars || 5–2 ||  || A. Ladd || O. Pavelec || MTS Centre || 15,004 || 33–29–8 || 74
|- align="center" bgcolor=#ccffcc
| 71 || March 16 || Washington Capitals || 3–2 ||  || D. Byfuglien || O. Pavelec || MTS Centre || 15,004 || 34–29–8 || 76
|- align="center" bgcolor=#ffbbbb
| 72 || March 18 || Carolina Hurricanes || 3–4 ||  || A. Miettien || O. Pavelec || MTS Centre || 15,004 || 34–30–8 || 76
|- align="center" bgcolor=#ffbbbb
| 73 || March 20 || @ Pittsburgh Penguins || 4–8 ||  || J. Neal || O. Pavelec || Consol Energy Center || 18,589 || 34–31–8 || 76
|- align="center" bgcolor=#ccffcc
| 74 || March 23 || @ Washington Capitals || 4–3 || OT || A. Ovechkin || O. Pavelec || Verizon Center || 18,506 || 35–31–8 || 78
|- align="center" bgcolor=#ffbbbb
| 75 || March 24 || @ Nashville Predators || 1–3 ||  || P. Rinne || O. Pavelec || Bridgestone Arena || 17,113 || 35–32–8 || 78
|- align="center" bgcolor=#ffbbbb
| 76 || March 26 || Ottawa Senators || 4–6 ||  || E. Karlsson || O. Pavelec || MTS Centre || 15,004 || 35–33–8 || 78
|- align="center" bgcolor=#ffbbbb
| 77 || March 28 || New York Rangers || 2–4 ||  || M. Del Zotto || O. Pavelec || MTS Centre || 15,004 || 35–34–8 || 78
|- align="center" bgcolor=#ccffcc
| 78 || March 30 || @ Carolina Hurricanes || 4–3 || OT || A. Ladd || C. Mason || RBC Center || 18,680 || 36–34–8 || 80
|- align="center" bgcolor="white"
| 79 || March 31 || @ Tampa Bay Lightning || 2–3 || OT || R. Malone || O. Pavelec || St. Pete Times Forum || 19,204 || 36–34–9 || 81
|-

|- align="center" bgcolor=#ccffcc
| 80 || April 3 || @ Florida Panthers || 5–4 || OT || A. Ladd || O. Pavelec || BankAtlantic Center || 17,760 || 37–34–8 || 83
|- align="center" bgcolor=#ffbbbb
| 81 || April 5 || @ New York Islanders || 4–5 ||  || M. Grabner || C. Mason || Nassau Veterans Memorial Coliseum || 13,048 || 37–35–8 || 83
|- align="center" bgcolor="white"
| 82 || April 7 || Tampa Bay Lightning || 3–4 || OT || T. Purcell || O. Pavelec || MTS Centre || 15,004 || 37–35–9 || 84
|-

|-
| 2011–12 scheduleJets score listed first;

Player statistics

Skaters

Goaltenders 
Note: GP = Games played; Min = Minutes played; W = Wins; L = Losses; OT = Overtime losses; GA = Goals against; GAA= Goals against average; SA= Shots against; SV= Saves; Sv% = Save percentage; SO= Shutouts

†Denotes player spent time with another team before joining Jets. Stats reflect time with the Jets only.
‡Traded mid-season
underline/italics denotes franchise record

Awards and records

Awards

Milestones

Records

Transactions 
Winnipeg has been involved in the following transactions during the 2011–12 season.

Trades

Free agents signed

Free agents lost

Claimed via waivers

Lost via waivers

Lost via retirement

Player signings

Draft picks 
Winnipeg's picks at the 2011 NHL Entry Draft in St. Paul, Minnesota.

See also 
 2011–12 NHL season

References 

Winnipeg Jets seasons
Winnipeg Jets season, 2011-12
Winn